Valeo is a French global automotive supplier.

Valeo may also refer to:

Francis R. Valeo (1916–2006), the Secretary of the United States Senate 
Valeo Foods, Irish multinational producer of branded food and beverage products

See also
Vallejo (disambiguation)
Vale (disambiguation)